VeggieTales is an American Christian media, computer-generated musical children's animation and book franchise. The series presents life lessons according to a biblical world view, featuring various fruit and vegetable characters retelling Christian stories.

Main

Bob the Tomato
 Voiced by Phil Vischer (1992–2022)

Bob the Tomato (introduced 1992) is a friendly but slightly high-strung tomato and host of VeggieTales. As the creator and original voice of the character, Phil Vischer has often cited Bob as being " my inner Mr. Rogers...though a frustrated Mr. Rogers, because he couldn’t get things to go as smoothly." Alongside his best friend, Larry the Cucumber, the pair introduce and wrap-up almost every show and respond to viewer mail on a kitchen countertop. Bob plays character roles in the story segments and other times is simply the narrator or storyteller. He also has a tech-savvy superhero alter-ego ThingamaBob, who is a member of The League of Incredible Vegetables. Bob also partakes in some of the "Silly Songs with Larry" segments, even performing his own Silly Song, "Lance the Turtle".

Bob made his first appearance in a 1992 short entitled "VeggieTales Promo: Take 38", where he gives a passionate speech pitching the concept of VeggieTales to potential investors. Bob eventually made his public debut in 1993 with the episode "Where's God When I'm S-Scared?." Bob plays himself in "Tales from the Crisper", where he tries to comfort a frightened Junior Asparagus with the song "God is Bigger". The end of this episode also started a running gag in which Bob gets interrupted by the "What We Have Learned" wrap-up song. He regularly gets annoyed while waiting for the song to finish so he and Larry can discuss the lesson of the show and receive a Bible verse from Qwerty.

In the Netflix original series VeggieTales in the House and VeggieTales in the City, Bob is seen living with Larry inside a small Veggie-sized house inside a human-sized house on the kitchen countertop from the original direct-to-video series. He is portrayed engaging in slice of life activities instead of focusing on hosting the show. Bob also has various jobs, mostly working part-time at Pa Grape's General Store. At the end of the series, Bob becomes the owner. Bob is also shown to have an affinity for sock collecting and weather observation. For The VeggieTales Show, Bob acts more like he did in the original series acting as the director and master of ceremonies for the stage shows the Veggies put on in Mr. Nezzer's theater. Here, his role is much more akin to that of Kermit the Frog from The Muppet Show, which was a direct inspiration for this series. Bob also reprises his role as ThigamaBob in "LarryBoy" episodes.

Larry the Cucumber
 Voiced by Mike Nawrocki (1992–2022)

Larry the Cucumber (introduced 1991) is a silly cucumber, Bob's best friend, and co-host of VeggieTales. Larry has a singular tooth and a quirky, child-like personality to match in contrast to the more mature Bob. In regards to the basic relationship of Bob and Larry, Phil Vischer has stated that "Bob wants to help kids, Larry wants to help Bob." But because Larry is rather scatterbrained, he and Bob sometimes disagree about how to best teach a lesson or tell a story. Sometimes, Larry faces similar struggles to the kids who send in fan mail and ends up learning an episode's lesson along with the viewer. In the story segments though, Larry plays many character roles and has several recurring ones, such as Minnesota Cuke (a parody of Indiana Jones), the first mate of The Pirates Who Don't Do Anything, and the comical plunger-headed superhero LarryBoy. Larry also has his own recurring musical segment called "Silly Songs with Larry", in which he performs humorous musical numbers. This became a very popular staple of VeggieTales and has been featured in nearly every episode of the original series, including several sing-along and compilation videos. Larry is also notable for being one of the few Veggie characters to speak about his family. He talks about his aunt Ruth in the Silly Songs "I Love My Lips" and "The Song of the Cebu". In "Duke and the Great Pie War," he introduces his three brothers, Bob, Mark, and Steve, who perform their own version of the "What We Have Learned" song. In the same episode (and more prominently in the opening of "The Wonderful Wizard of Ha's") Larry brings up his father, who is an astronaut.

Larry was first created by Phil Vischer in 1991 as a chocolate bar, but then changed to a cucumber, due to Vischer's wife, Lisa, suggesting that parents wouldn’t like videos starring a candy bar because it might promote poor eating habits. After being turned into a cucumber, Larry was used to make a 20-second animation test called "Mr. Cuke's Screen Test", which was the genesis of VeggieTales. Larry then appeared in "VeggieTales Promo: Take 38" chasing after his blue wind-up lobster toy while Bob gave his speech. However, Larry's public debut was in the first episode, "Where's God When I'm S-Scared?". Throughout the episode, he is established as the source of most of the jokes, including physical gags and silly dialogue. The video also featured the first Silly Song: "The Water Buffalo Song". For the first two episodes, Mike Nawrocki performed Larry's voice using a more natural tenor and lower range that made the character sound more dim-witted. Starting with the third episode "Are You My Neighbor?," Nawrocki changed the scope of Larry's voice to an upper range and included a slight lisp, giving Larry a more youthful and sillier sound. Gradually, Larry's speech impediment became less and less prominent with each subsequent video release.

For VeggieTales in the House and VeggieTales in the City, Larry is Bob’s roommate in an Odd Couple scenario, with Larry being the Oscar to Bob’s Felix. In these series, Larry's interests and hobbies consist of such silly activities as eating sardines, riding his bike on the ceiling, and playing make-believe. Like Bob, he is also seen working part-time jobs, such as an ice cream vendor and at Pa Grape’s General Store. He is also still seen as LarryBoy, haphazardly fighting crime and facing off against his arch-enemy of the series, Motato. For The VeggieTales Show, Larry acts more like his old self, often presenting wacky ideas backstage before the shows begin and still writing occasional Silly Songs, including writing the series’ theme song as seen in the pilot episode "God Wants Us To Make Peace". Larry also reprises his role as LarryBoy in episodes that take place outside of the theater setting, often re-appearing with The League of Incredible Vegetables.

Junior Asparagus
 Voiced by Lisa Vischer (1993–2014; 2019–2022), Tress MacNeille (2014–2017)

Junior Asparagus (introduced 1993) is courteous little asparagus who is one of the co-stars of VeggieTales. He is a stereotypical five-year-old boy who is generally good-hearted but can let his curiosity get him into trouble. He is most often seen wearing a yellow baseball cap with a red brim. Junior has many lead role in several episodes, including his debut in "Where's God When I'm S-Scared?," as well as in "Dave and the Giant Pickle," "Lyle the Kindly Viking," "Lord of the Beans," and "Pistachio – The Little Boy That Woodn't." He is a band member of Boyz in the Sink, along with Larry, Mr. Lunt, and Jimmy Gourd. Junior also has his own bedtime-themed Silly Song called "Goodnight Junior." He has a prominent role in most "LarryBoy" episodes, eventually gaining the superhero alter-ego "Ricochet" in "The League of Incredible Vegetables." Junior is also notable for having the privilege to appear alongside Bob on the opening countertop segments in place of Larry in the episodes "Josh and the Big Wall!" and "Abe and the Amazing Promise."

In VeggieTales in the House and VeggieTales in the City, Junior is seen doing more typical things like going to public school or playing with his friends and/or dad. He is depicted living with his family in a house built inside a refrigerator. At one point, Junior befriends a wild "Buffal-Orange" whom he tries to make his pet. He also got a new super alter-ego named Junior Jetpack who sometimes fights alongside LarryBoy. In The VeggieTales Show, Junior has a prominent role helping perform in the shows put on in the theater. In this series, he is revealed to be homeschooled (as an explanation for participating in the shows during the day). He also reprises his roles as Dave from "Dave and the Giant Pickle" in the episode "Little Things Matter" and as Ricochet in some of the "LarryBoy" episodes.

Petunia Rhubarb
 Voiced by Cydney Trent (2005–2014), Tress MacNeille (2014–2017), Kira Buckland (2019–present)

Petunia Rhubarb (introduced 2005) is a kind red-headed rhubarb and the lead female protagonist in the series. She has a bubbly personality and is a strong advocate for such values as inner beauty, self-worth and empathy. She usually wears business-casual or a purple dress and her hair is usually braided into a ponytail. Her skin is green and she is more humanoid in her design and features. Her first appearance was in "Duke and the Great Pie War" playing the part of Princess "Sweet Sweet" Petunia – the scorned "Ruth" figure waiting to be redeemed by Larry's "Boaz". Because of this, Petunia is often paired with Larry as a female co-star. She later appeared as the title character in another princess-themed episode, "Sweetpea Beauty." Petunia also has a reoccurring role in the LarryBoy episodes as a reporter and later her own fashionista super alter-ego: Vogue. She also sang alongside Larry in the Silly Song, "Where Have All The Staplers Gone?".

In VeggieTales in the House and VeggieTales in the City, she appears as the owner of a flower shop and works alongside her best friend Tina Celerina. Petunia also worked part-time at Pa Grape's General Store early on in the series and is seen helping Mayor Archibald in various episodes as an assistant. In The VeggieTales Show, she is the leader of the VeggieTales Fan Club, providing the letters from kids to help inspire the theme for each show. She also reprises her role as Vouge in some of the "LarryBoy" episodes.

Laura Carrot 
 Voiced by Kristen Blegen (1995–2005), Jackie Ritz (2002–2005), Megan Murphy Chambers (2009), Keri Pisapia (2010–2013) Gigi Abraham (2014), Tress MacNeille (2014–2017), Kira Buckland (2019–present)

Laura Carrot (introduced 1995) is a sweet and determined young carrot and Junior's best friend. She has freckles and blonde hair that is often adorned in pigtails and a blue hair bow. She first appeared in "The Story of Flibber-o-loo" as a background character and got her first major speaking role in "Rack, Shack and Benny." Laura doesn’t get many starring roles, but often gets a chance in the spotlight when a young female lead is needed. For example, in "Princess and the Popstar she plays Princess Poppyseed, in "Babysitter in De-Nile" she plays Miriam, and in "Celery Night Fever" she plays herself. Her more notable supporting roles include the first two "LarryBoy" episodes, "Saint Nicholas: A Story of Joyful Giving," and starring in the subplot of the Jonah feature film. Laura also has her own Silly Song titled "B.F.F" where she sings with her friend Lavinia while using texting slang for lyrics.

In VeggieTales in the House and VeggieTales in the City, Laura has a much more prominent role overall, featured in many episodes as the lead character. She appears in the first episode alongside Larry as they learn a lesson in responsibility while trying to earn money to adopt puppies. Laura is also shown having an affinity for other animals, such as owning a pet guppy, starting an animal-sitting service, and even becoming "The Guppy Whisperer" to help other Veggies take care of their pets. She lives in a carrot-shaped house built into the side of the kitchen island. She also goes to school with Junior where she also befriends a bullied girl named Callie Flower. Laura also gained a superhero persona – Night Pony – mentored by the retired Granny Asparagus. In The VeggieTales Show, Laura returns to help the Veggie gang put on their shows, but appears less often than the others. She has notable roles in the episodes "The Power of Love" and "Naaman Takes A Bath" where she has a crush on a Veggie pop-star named Jimmy Lucky and trains as Bob’s assistant stage manager, respectively.

Madame Blueberry 
 Voiced by Megan Moore Burns (1998), Gail Freeman-Bock (1999), Jackie Ritz (2002–2009), Megan Murphy Chambers (2006–2014), Tress MacNeille (2014–2017), Stephanie Southerland (2019–present)

Madame Blueberry (introduced 1998) is a French blueberry with a thick French accent who first appeared as the titular character in "Madame Blueberry." Her name and the theme of this video are both allusions to the tale of Madame Bovary, and as such, Madame Blueberry was cast early on as a vain character.  As such, her physical appearance is somewhat extravagant, often wearing fancy hats, wigs, pearls, and heavy makeup. Although a blueberry, she is similar in size to Bob the Tomato and much larger than the similarly sized in-real-life French Peas. Madame Blueberry also has a reoccurring role as the Mayor of Bumblyburg in the "LarryBoy" episodes.

For VeggieTales in the House and VeggieTales in the City, Madame Blueberry appeared as a much more stuffy character, so much so that her voice changed to having a RP accent. Although still hailing from France, she was portrayed liking very stereotypically British things, such as cups of tea and minding her manners. She is even seen living in a blue tea-pot shaped house built into the side of the kitchen island. On some occasions, she donned the persona "Madame Clue-berry" solving mysteries all the while being rather clueless. She also garnered the nickname "Madame Blue" from her friends. When Madame returned for The VeggieTales Show, she started acting more like she did in the original series and had her French accent once again. She also leans more heavily into her role as a singer, now specifically labeling herself as a French opera singer. She also reprises her role as the Mayor for a few "LarryBoy" episodes.

Mr. Lunt
 Voiced by Phil Vischer (1995–2022)

Mr. Lunt (introduced 1995) is a yellow decorative gourd with a Hispanic accent who grew up in New Jersey. He is often the source of very irreverent commentary and doesn’t shy away from being argumentative or ill-tempered at times. His notable character features are his gold tooth, a brown pencil thin mustache, and his lack of any eyes forcing the use of the brim of his panama hat or eyebrow wrinkles for expression. He often appears as Mr. Nezzer's assistant and sidekick, introduced as such his debut in "Rack, Shack & Benny." The pair were typically used as the series' "bad guys" in early VeggieTales episodes, usually being redeemed by the episode’s end. Mr. Lunt has also appeared as an individual antagonist, such as playing Haman in "Esther... the Girl Who Became Queen" and Otis the Elevated in "Duke and the Great Pie War." In the latter episode, Mr. Lunt and Mr. Nezzer's roles are reversed with Mr. Nezzer playing the sidekick to Mr. Lunt. He also prominently appears as one of The Pirates Who Don't Do Anything and as the leader of the Veggie boy band, Boyz in the Sink. In addition to his Boyz songs, Mr. Lunt has starred in two of his own Silly Songs: "His Cheeseburger" and "Donuts for Benny". He also got a superhero alter-ego in the "LarryBoy" series as a quick caped-crusader named S-Cape, whom is a member of The League of Incredible Vegetables.

In VeggieTales in the House and VeggieTales in the City, Mr. Lunt appears very sparingly. Often in quick cameo appearances, he was shown to have various jobs, such as a delivery guy and the owner of his own repair shop. Mr. Lunt’s most notable appearance was in the episode "The Missing Jetpack" where he learns a lesson about telling the truth after lying to Junior about losing his jetpack. Mr. Lunt returned with a more prominent role in The VeggieTales Show, often contributing wild ideas and skits that usually end in disaster. Some of his contributions include taking on the role of Wink Gourdindale to host a game show called "Wheel of Bravery", selling a product called "Relationship Glue", and diving into a vat of eggnog. Mr. Lunt also reprises his role as S-Cape in the "LarryBoy" episodes of the series.

Pa Grape
 Voiced by Phil Vischer (1994–2022)

Pa Grape (introduced 1994) is a wise, elderly green grape. He has a bushy gray mustache and eyebrows, wears a black top hat, oval framed glasses, and speaks with a slight Yiddish accent. Pa is often seen as a trusted authority figure amongst the VeggieTales cast, though he sometimes comes off as senile when he shares some of his slightly odder anecdotes. According to an interview in the "What's the Big Idea?" magazine, Pa stated he was held back in the 2nd grade for 13 years and was worried about his lack of any physical eyes. Pa made his first appearance in "God Wants Me to Forgive Them!?!" as the father of The Grapes of Wrath. He is typically cast as a sage or fatherly figure, including such roles as Jesse in "Dave and the Giant Pickle," Little Joe's father in "The Ballad of Little Joe," Mordecai in "Esther... The Girl Who Became Queen," and the angel sent to guide Gideon (Larry the Cucumber) in "Gideon: Tuba Warrior." He also has a reoccurring role as the captain of The Pirates Who Don't Do Anything, appearing alongside Larry and Mr. Lunt and starring as the lead of their own feature film. Pa likes to invent and tinker as well, a part of his personality that is influenced by his role as the eccentric Victorian inventor Seymour Schwenk in the holiday specials "The Star of Christmas" and "An Easter Carol."

When Pa appeared in VeggieTales in the House and VeggieTales in the City, he appeared with eyes for the very first time, as well as gaining a tinier hat and a bushier mustache that completely covered his mouth. He is seen owning a general store in the house, built into the side of the kitchen island. His store is used as the setting for many of the episodes. He almost always tries teaching a lesson or giving biblical advice to the other Veggies, but is initially ignored on occasion. For The VeggieTales Show, Pa appears frequently as a narrator for the show's Bible story segments and often helps decide what Bible stories are best to use for the topic of the day's show. He also stops wearing his hat in this series.

Jimmy and Jerry Gourd 
 Jimmy: Voiced by Phil Vischer (1995–2022)
 Jerry: Voiced by Mike Nawrocki (1995–2022)

Jimmy and Jerry Gourd (introduced 1995) are fun-loving gourd brothers who appear as a secondary comic duo. While Bob and Larry can be considered animated versions of Abbott and Costello, Jimmy and Jerry more closely resemble Tweedledee and Tweedledum. Despite being very similar and hard to tell apart, the two have some traits to help them stand out from each other. For example, Jimmy is shorter, orange, very talkative, and has a boisterous personality. Jerry is taller, yellow and green, soft-spoken, and much more monotone. The pair debuted together in "Are You My Neighbor?" portraying the "new guys” and establishing their love of eating and singing show tunes. As the series progressed, they continued to appear in supporting roles. Jimmy appears more often than his brother, including starring roles in the "Omelet" and "Dr. Jiggle and Mr. Sly" story segments and as a reoccurring member of Boyz in the Sink. Another notable appearance for the duo is the opening of "King George and the Ducky," where they wear poorly made cardboard cutout costumes of Bob and Larry in an attempt to impersonate them and take over the show. Jerry also has a notable appearance with Mr. Lunt in "His Cheeseburger" furthering his and his brother’s reputation as loving to eat.

In VeggieTales in the House and VeggieTales in the City, Jimmy and Jerry were shown as Bob and Larry’s neighbors, living in the pantry on the other end of the kitchen countertop. The Gourd brothers also own pets in the series – a dust bunny named Danny and a guppy named Happy Sunshine Bubbles. They returned in The VeggieTales Show as well, appearing both backstage and onstage to help put on the shows in the theater.

Archibald Asparagus 
 Voiced by Phil Vischer (1992–2022)

Archibald "Archie" Asparagus (introduced 1992) serves as the stereotypical role of a stuffy, classically-educated British "gentleman" in contrast with the rest of his co-stars. He typically wears a red bowtie, has a monocle on his right eye, and speaks with an Oxford English accent. Archibald first appeared in the 1992 short "VeggieTales Promo: Take 38" to interrupt and object to the creation of such a show as VeggieTales, claiming it to be utter nonsense. Archibald made his official debut in "Where's God When I'm S-Scared?," playing the regal King Darius role in the story segment of "Daniel and the Lion's Den". This episode also started the continuing theme of his distain towards Larry the Cucumber's "Silly Songs" segments. He claims they are "too silly", emphasized when he interrupts "The Water Buffalo Song" to chastise Larry. In a storyline that lasted the span of a few episodes, Archibald eventually learns to loosen up after an incident where he cancelled "Silly Songs with Larry" and learned how much the segment meant to VeggieTales fans in "The End of Silliness?." Archibald eventually appears in other Silly Songs specifically starring him, including "The Biscuit of Zazzamarandabo" and "Astonishing Wigs". Archibald also has a recurring role as LarryBoy's faithful butler Alfred (who is just called "Archibald" in the 2-D cartoon spin-off series) and was featured as the title character in Jonah: A VeggieTales Movie. Archibald has also been a narrator for "The Good Egg of Gooseville" and "Lyle the Kindly Viking," where in the latter he got to host the show in the style of Masterpiece Theatre.

For VeggieTales in the House and VeggieTales in the City, Archibald was portrayed as the mayor of the town inside the house. Because of his social status, he was regarded as bureaucrat and a more authoritative character as a result. He was mostly seen doing mayoral duties such as public speeches. However, his new job didn’t keep him from engaging in more fun social activities with the other Veggies, such as camping trips and birthday parties. For The VeggieTales Show, Archibald resumes his regular role from the original series. He appears frequently onstage as a performer, often narrating the Bible story segments. He also reappears as Alfred in the "LarryBoy" episodes of the series.

Mr. Nezzer 
 Voiced by Phil Vischer (1995–2014; understudy, 2021–2022) and David Mann (2019–2021)

Mr. Nezzer (introduced 1995) is a rich, middle-aged zucchini businessman. Always seen in a formal shirt and a necktie, he is appropriately business-minded but is sometimes a tad egotistical. Although always apart of the VeggieTales gang, he is somewhat aloof compared to the others because of his social status as the owner of many successful companies and businesses. Often cast in antagonistic roles, Mr. Nezzer himself truly isn’t a villain. Often he or the characters he plays are usually just misguided in their actions and are redeemed by an episode’s end. A great example is his debut in "Rack, Shack & Benny" as the whimsical but menacing chocolate factory owner "Nebby K. Nezzer" (an allusion to Nebuchadnezzar II). It's also in this episode that Nezzer performs the fan-favorite and controversial song "The Bunny Song". Other antagonistic roles include playing Wally P. Nezzer, a toy factory owner and brother of Nebby K. Nezzer in "The Toy That Saved Christmas," Victorian theater and Easter egg factory owner Ebenezer Nezzer (an allusion to Ebenezer Scrooge) in "The Star of Christmas" and "An Easter Carol." In addition to these roles, Mr. Nezzer also plays well-meaning authority figures in the stories, such as his role as King Xerxes in "Esther... The Girl Who Became Queen," Olaf the Viking in "Lyle the Kindly Viking," and the Mayor of Dodgeball City in "The Ballad of Little Joe" and "Moe and the Big Exit."

Mr. Nezzer was absent in VeggieTales in the House or VeggieTales in the City due to DreamWorks (who produced the series) perceiving the character's voice as perpetuating an African-American stereotype being voiced by Phil Vischer (who is Caucasian and based Nezzer's voice on Ken Page's performance as Oogie Boogie from The Nightmare Before Christmas). In turn, Nezzer was replaced with a similar-looking but different sounding character named Ichabeezer. Mr. Nezzer eventually returned for The VeggieTales Show as the owner of the theater the Veggies use for their new show. He mostly makes short appearances in each episode to announce the curtain call for the beginning of each show, much to Bob’s dismay for wanting more time to prepare. However, Nezzer did appear onstage at least once in a character role, portraying King Saul in the episode "Little Things Matter".

The French Peas
 Jean-Claude: Voiced by Mike Nawrocki (1996–2022)
 Phillipe: Voiced by Phil Vischer (1996–2022)
 Cristoffe: Voiced by Chris Olsen (1996)

The French Peas (introduced 1996) are a vast group of hardworking, yet cheeky green peas with French accents. Usually only represented by Jean-Claude and Phillipe, they are sometimes joined by other French Peas, including one named Cristoffe who appears infrequently. They are often a source of comedy for the series and function as ancillary crew members behind the scenes. They debuted portraying the Philistines in "Dave and the Giant Pickle" as an allusion to the French soldiers in Monty Python and the Holy Grail. They later appeared in "Josh and the Big Wall!" as the slushee-throwing guards of Jericho, continuing the allusion to the Monty Python characters and directly parodying the behavior of tormenting passersby with strange, nonsensical threats. The Peas continue appearing in subsequent episodes, often playing mischievous or supporting characters. The French Peas have also taken over the show in a few instances, including when Jean-Claude narrated in the episode "Madame Blueberry" and when they assisted Archibald in "Lyle the Kindly Viking" to somewhat disastrous results. They also have their own Silly Song "Hopperena" in the episode "'Twas the Night Before Easter."

When appearing in VeggieTales in the House and VeggieTales in the City, Jean-Claude and Phillipe appeared very infrequently as tertiary characters. The only starring role was Jean-Claude appearing solo in the episode "Pa Grape's Son" going to a father-son day festival with Pa Grape as his "father-for-the-day" while his real dad is in France. Both Jean-Claude and Phillipe returned for The VeggieTales Show, seen assisting backstage as stagehands and prop makers in addition to appearing onstage in the shows.

Supporting

Qwerty
 Voiced by Mike Nawrocki

Qwerty is the desktop computer seen on the kitchen countertop with which Bob and Larry use to read the Bible verse at the end of each show. Qwerty's name is derived from the first six letters that appear on a standard English keyboard. Though Qwerty is not alive per se, he does have certain anthropomorphic characteristics, including responsory sounds and voice activation. In almost every episode, Bob (or on occasion, Larry) says "We're over here by Qwerty to talk about what we learned today." This phrase triggers the "What We Have Learned" song to play. Qwerty is not always perfect at retrieving the verse, usually sputtering and taking a moment to load it. In the first episode, "Where's God When I'm S-Scared?," Qwerty accidentally posts a meatloaf recipe rather than a Bible verse.

According to Phil Vischer, the original design for Qwerty was based on an Intel 80386 model computer. Qwerty was slightly updated in "Abe and the Amazing Promise," giving two verses instead of one, and got a more life-changing update in the episode "Pistachio - The Little Boy That Woodn't" where he got a voice chip installed. The design of the new update, including a sleeker look and a black screen instead of the original blue, is reminiscent of an Apple iMac. While Qwerty did not appear in VeggieTales in the House or VeggieTales in the City, he was mentioned in episode "The Lost Dust Bunny" in the latter series. Qwerty did not appear in The VeggieTales Show because Phil Vischer felt that he didn’t fit in with the theater setting. However, Qwerty is credited for appearing in some of the "LarryBoy" episodes of the series, appearing as LarryBoy’s super-computer.

Mom and Dad Asparagus
 Mom Asparagus: Voiced by Gail Freeman-Bock (1993), Lisa Vischer (singing voice, 1995–2014), Jackie Ritz (2002–2004), Megan Murphy Chambers (2006), Keri Pisapia (2011-2012), Tress MacNeille (2014–2017)
 Dad Asparagus: Voiced by Dan Anderson (1993–2011), Mike Nawrocki (2002), J. Chris Wall (2012), Rob Paulsen (2014–2017)

Mom and Dad Asparagus are Junior’s caring and supportive parents. They appear in the series to give Junior advice or teach him how to behave properly. They first appeared in "Where’s God When I’m S-Scared?" in traditional parental roles as their son deals with facing his fears. Both parents appear more prominently in the early videos, with Dad appearing more often as the series goes on. They are almost always together or alongside Junior. Unlike most other VeggieTales characters, Mom and Dad usually appear as themselves and not in character roles. Probably their biggest roles to date are as Reverend Gilbert and his wife, Mrs. Gilbert, in the holiday specials "The Star of Christmas" and "An Easter Carol." They also can both be seen in the original opening theme song for the series alongside their son with Bob and Larry. Originally, both parents were simply named "Dad" and "Mom" respectively, but they were given the more proper names "Mike and Lisa" (after VeggieTales co-creator Mike Nawrocki and his wife, Lisa) for the VeggieTales in the House series. Mike is also referred to as "Captain Mike" and portrayed having a job as an astronaut.

The Scallions
 Scallion #1: Voiced by Phil Vischer
 Scallion #2: Voiced by Mike Nawrocki
 Scallion #3: Voiced by Mike Sage (1993–2002), Brian K. Roberts (2006–2012), Mike Nawrocki (2014, 2020–2022)

The Scallions are a trio of devious scallions who are among the most consistent antagonists in VeggieTales, having appeared as bandits, swindlers, salesmen, and many other rapscallion types. Their debut was as the Wisemen opposite Larry's "Daniel" in the "Daniel and the Lions' Den" segment from "Where's God When I'm S-Scared?." They all have no names, simply referred to as Scallion #1, #2 and #3. Scallion #1 is the tallest and leader of the group, with a long purple nose and is often seen with his stalks slicked back to mimic a ducktail hairstyle. Scallion #2 is the second tallest with a small greenish yellow nose, while Scallion #3 is the shortest of the trio and has a big blue nose. They also participate with Frankencelery to form a group of quartet singers for the Silly Song "The Yodeling Veterinarian of the Alps" as well as the songs "Listen", and "A Helping Hand". Occasionally, one of the Scallions will make a solo appearance. For example, Scallion #1 appeared as a salesman selling the Forgive-O-Matic device in "God Wants Me to Forgive Them!?!" and as the Englishman and Cedric in "King George and the Ducky." Scallion #3 also appeared as the Milk Money Bandit in "LarryBoy and the Rumor Weed."

Scooter
 Voiced by Jim Poole (1995–2014), Tim Hodge (2005–2006), Sean Chiplock (2021–2022)

Scooter is feisty and rather eccentric Scottish carrot. He has a thick Scottish accent and a bushy white mustache and eyebrows. He first appeared as the ship engineer of the U.S.S. Applepies (in a spoof of Scotty from the original Star Trek television series) in "The Gourds Must Be Crazy" segment from "Are You My Neighbor?." He has also gone on to have many substantial supporting roles in the videos, such as the slightly savage Moyer the Destroyer in "The Star of Christmas" and its sequel, "An Easter Carol," Mr. McPotiphar (the western equivalent of the Potiphar) in "The Ballad of Little Joe," as well as a recurring role as a police officer in the "LarryBoy" episodes. He also had a significant starring role as the eccentric Mr. Butterbun in "Dr. Jiggle and Mr. Sly" from "A Snoodle's Tale." Scooter is also very proud of his Scottish heritage, as seen in the Silly Song "Kilts and Stilts".

Grandpa George 
 Voiced by Phil Vischer

George (introduced 1995) is an old green onion with a handlebar mustache who often narrates some of the episodes. He first appeared in "Rack, Shack, and Benny" to act as the chocolate factory's security guard and narrated the story. George later narrates the series' first Christmas special, where he is portrayed as a postman and revealed to be the grandfather of Annie Onion. After a 12-year break from narrating, George appeared to narrate "Tomato Sawyer and Huckleberry Larry's Big River Rescue" as the storyteller Clark Wayne (a parody of Mark Twain). George made a few small appearances throughout the rest of the original series, often playing elderly or wise characters.

Annie Onion
 Voiced by Shelby Vischer (1996–2002), Ally Nawrocki (2005–2011), Maggie Roberts (2011–2013), Megan Murphy Chambers (2014)

Annie (introduced 1996) is a tender-hearted green onion who is friends with Junior and Laura. She first appeared in "The Toy That Saved Christmas" being told a Christmas-themed bedtime story by her grandpa, George. Annie later appeared in "Madame Blueberry," playing a poor girl who shows Madame Blueberry how to be thankful. Annie’s parents appeared with her as well, in silent cameo roles. Her father and mother were respectively modeled after Phil and Lisa Vischer as an inside joke by concept artist Joseph Sapulich. Annie has made subsequent appearances, often seen alongside Junior and the other Veggie kids, such as the "Bully Trouble" segment from "Minnesota Cuke and the Search for Samson’s Hairbrush" and the Jonah feature film.

Percy and Li'l Pea
 Percy: Voiced by Phil Vischer
 Li'l Pea: Voiced by Lesly Benodin (1996–1999), Mike Nawrocki (2005; 2020)

Percy and Li'l Pea (introduced 1996) are pea brothers and friends of Junior, Laura and Annie. They first appear in "The Toy That Saved Christmas" alongside their friends and parents. Their largest supporting roles are in "Larry-Boy! And the Fib from Outer Space!," "Larry-Boy and the Rumor Weed," and "Bully Trouble" from "Minnesota Cuke and the Search for Samson's Hairbrush."

Oscar the Polish Caterer
 Voiced by Mike Nawrocki (1996–2022), J. Chris Wall (2007), Phil Vischer (2013)

Oscar (introduced 1996) is a pale yellow gourd with a Polish accent. He has black hair with a mustache and often wears a chef's hat and apron. He often appears in culinary roles, such as a food caterer, a chef, an ice cream man, etc. He was first mentioned in the Silly Song "Love My Lips" by Larry as he recounts  meeting Oscar in "lip therapy." Although Oscar's first proper appearance in the series was in the Silly Song "The Blues with Larry", he original debuted on the album A Very Veggie Christmas to cater the Veggie's Christmas party and sing "The Eight Polish Foods of Christmas," which he later reprised as a Silly Song for "The Little Drummer Boy" (2011). Oscar often appears in silent cameos in the background of episodes throughout the late 2000s and into the 2010s.

Miss Achmetha
 Voiced by Charlotte Jackson (2000–2011), Gail Freeman-Bock (2002), Elise Napier (2020–2021)

Miss Achmetha (introduced 2000) is a green onion who made her first appearance singing the song "Lost Puppies" in "Esther... The Girl Who Became Queen." Miss Achmetha is known for her constantly twitching eye, her somewhat absentminded or annoyed demeanor, and her accordion playing. She also appears in speaking and non-speaking parts in the Silly Songs, including "SUV" (which she sang alongside Larry), "Larry's High Silk Hat" and "Bellybutton". After an eleven year absence, Miss Achmetha returned in The VeggieTales Show, participating onstage in the shows put on in the theater.

Khalil the Caterpillar
 Voiced by Tim Hodge (2002–2014), Todd Waterman (2021–2022)

Khalil (introduced 2002) is a caterpillar with an Indian accent who first appeared in Jonah: A VeggieTales Movie as a rug salesman and foil/conscience to Jonah (Archibald Asparagus). He corresponds to the worm in the book of Jonah that eats and withers Jonah's shade plant. In the film, Khalil claims that his mother was a caterpillar and that his father was a worm, explaining his peculiar physical appearance. He often claims his skills come from his heritage, such as "Insight runs very deep in my family." He was later heard as the voice of the sock puppet Lutfi, filling in for Larry on the countertop segments and telling the story of Saint Patrick in the style of a fanciful flannelgraph in the episode "Sumo of the Opera." In one of his few later appearances, he played a parody version of the Jiminy Cricket character in the video "Pistachio – The Little Boy That Woodn't." He also has a reoccurring role performing as a guest artist with Boyz in the Sink. Khalil returns in The VeggieTales Show playing music from the orchestra pit as a one-man band.

Charlie Pincher 
 Voiced by Tim Hodge, Mike Nawrocki (singing voice only, 2009)

Charlie Pincher (introduced 2002) is an old scallion who first appeared in "The Star of Christmas." He is scraggly in appearance, donning a five o'clock shadow with crooked stalks and a nose to match. Charlie often speaks in a cockney accent, but sometimes has a southern accent depending on the character he's playing. He is frequently cast as a hermit or an aloof character. His other notable appearances include "Lord of the Beans," "Moe and the Big Exit,"  "Abe and the Amazing Promise," and "Pistachio – The Little Boy That Woodn't" and the short "Bob's Vacation" from the compilation DVD "God Made You Special."

Gourdon Smithson
 Voiced by Brian K. Roberts

Gourdon Smithson (introduced 2005) is a yellow gourd who is a schoolyard bully around Junior Asparagus' age. He first appeared in "Bully Trouble" from "Minnesota Cuke and the Search for Samson's Hairbrush," bullying Junior and his friends off the local playground. Gourdon's later appearances are often in the background, aside from his roles as Bobby Bernard / Chester in "The Wonderful Wizard of Ha's."

Dr. Flurry 
 Voiced by Mark Steele (2012), Joe Zieja (2020–present)

Dr. Arvin Flurry (introduced 2012) is an eccentric gourd scientist who first appeared in "The League of Incredible Vegetables" as a villain trying to freeze others with their fears. He speaks with a German accent, has wild gray hair, a toothbrush mustache, and wears a lab coat. Eight years later, he appeared as a recurring character on The VeggieTales Show acting much more amiably and providing fun inventions and contributing skits for the shows.

Ichabeezer 
 Voiced by Rob Paulsen

Jehoaichim Money "Ichabeezer" (introduced 2014) is the grumpy and rich zucchini neighbor to Bob and Larry in VeggieTales in the House. Ichabeezer is used in the spin-off series in essentially the same manner as Mr. Nezzer in the direct-to-video series as either the gruff antagonist or as the vaguely simple-minded authority figure in the stories. In the following series, VeggieTales in the City, Ichabeezer opens a fast-food restaurant called "Ichaburger", which becomes a recurring setting for the stories.

Rooney the Olive Dog 
 Voiced by Phil Vischer

Rooney (introduced in 2014) is a "Barouni olive hound" and the prized pet of Ichabeezer in VeggieTales in the House. He is sweet but very rambunctious. He is quite pampered by Ichabeezer, often giving him expensive toys and treats.

Granny Asparagus 
 Voiced by Phil Vischer

Granny Asparagus (introduced in 2014) is Junior's elderly grandmother in VeggieTales in the House and VeggieTales in the City. She's a very stereotypical granny-type character, sometimes acting senile or being interested in things that are considered "old-fashioned". She also own a pet "cherry cat" named Mrs. Fuzzyface, of which she used to fight crime with under the alter-ego "Asparajustice" when she was younger.

Bacon Bill 
 Voiced by Rob Paulsen

Bacon Bill (introduced 2015) is an eccentric piece of bacon and a rocket scientist. He owns a shark rocket and is the grandson of an old friend of Pa Grape's. He sees Larry as "big brother" figure and the two eventually become very good friends. He only appears in VeggieTales in the House and VeggieTales in the City, leaving the house in the latter series to take over his grandfather's giant candy factory.

Bill is notable for being the first non-produce food character in the VeggieTales franchise.

Motato 
 Voiced by Rob Paulsen

Motato (introduced 2015) is a deformed potato supervillain who is LarryBoy's arch-nemesis in VeggieTales in the House. He is quite insane and enjoys wreaking havoc and chaos on the Veggie citizens of the house. He is aided by his minions, the Radishes. He also owned a pet lobster named Clampy in the episode "Gone Lobster". In VeggieTales in the City, Motato becomes a "good guy" at the end of the series after befriending Night Pony (Laura Carrot).

Tina Celerina 
 Voiced by Tress MacNeille

Tina Celerina (introduced 2015) is an excitable celery stalk who is Petunia Rhubarb's best friend. She helps Petunia run her flower shop and often hangs out with Bob and Larry. To date, she has only appeared in VeggieTales in the House and VeggieTales in the City.

Callie Flower 
 Voiced by Tress MacNeille (2015–2017) and Stephanie Southerland (2020–present)

Callie Flower (introduced 2015) is a young cauliflower who is friends with Junior and Laura. She first appeared in VeggieTales in the House in the aptly titled episode "Callie Flower." In the episode, Laura befriends Callie and learns how to be accepting of other people differences. Callie also struggles with a bully in the episode, Corneilus, who makes fun of her due to her interest in insects. Callie later appeared as a recurring character in The VeggieTales Show, starting with the episode, "A Lifetime Supply of Joy".

Minor

Frankencelery
 Voiced by Phil Vischer

Frankencelery is a stalk of celery who first appears in "Where's God When I'm S-Scared?" as the titular character of a Veggie horror TV show that scares Junior. Frankencelery later arrives to visit Junior and introduces himself as an actor from Toledo named Phil Winklestein. He reassures Junior that he is actually very amiable and only acting. He resembles the classic Frankenstein's monster, donning purple eyelids, a long green nose, cervical bolts, black hair, and a unibrow, even outside of his acting career. He has few other appearances throughout the series, but appears in a barbershop quartet with The Scallions in the Silly Song "The Yodeling Veterinarian of the Alps", as well as new material created for the compilation videos "Larry Learns to Listen" and "Bob Lends a Helping Hand". He also appeared in a cameo as a background citizen of Bumblyburg in "Larry-Boy and the Fib from Outer Space!"

Tom Grape
 Voiced by Phil Vischer

Tom Grape (introduced 1994) is Pa and Ma Grape's son and brother to Rosie. He has a strong Southern accent, complemented by a large brimmed cowboy-like hat that has a piece of wheat sticking out of the hatband. Like his father, Tom has no eyes to speak of. Tom made his first appearance in "God Wants Me to Forgive Them!?!" along with the rest of his family. His only other appearances have been in "Dave and the Giant Pickle" and "Josh and the Big Wall!," both times alongside Pa. Tom also appeared on the A Very Veggie Christmas album singing "Go Tell It On The Mountain" with his family and starred in is own picture book entitled Time for Tom.

The Peach
 Voiced by Mike Nawrocki

The Peach (introduced 1995) is a monotone peach who first appears in the Silly Song "The Hairbrush Song". He appears to have no actual name as he is only ever referred to as "the peach" by the other Veggie characters. He later appeared in the "Oh, Santa!" Silly Song where he played an IRS agent and appears in the background in "LarryBoy and the Fib from Outer-Space!" and on one of Larry's slides in the Silly Song "The Song of the Cebu". There is a running joke about the Peach that he, unlike most of the other characters, has a full head of hair. Because of this, he is depicted as Samson in "Minnesota Cuke and the Search for Samson's Hairbrush." His last appearance in the original series is a cameo role as a mall employee in "Merry Larry and the True Light of Christmas."

Goliath
 Voiced by Phil Vischer
Goliath (introduced 1996) is a larger-than-life 8-foot pickle who first appeared as the biblical Goliath figure in "Dave and the Giant Pickle." He talks in a deep and toneless voice, often speaking in short sentences or phrases. Most of the other Veggie characters find him quite intimidating, but outside of his acting roles, Goliath is more of a gentle giant in demeanor. He later made small cameos in "Josh and the Big Wall!" and "Madame Blueberry." After a fifteen-year absence, Goliath made a special appearance in the compilation video "Little Ones Can Do Big Things Too!" in some of the bridging segments on the kitchen countertop. After another seven-year absence, he appeared as a recurring character on The VeggieTales Show.

Apollo Gourd
 Voiced by Phil Vischer

Apollo Gourd (introduced 2001) is a massive yellow gourd who first appears in a non-speaking part in the Silly Song "Larry's High Silk Hat" in "Lyle the Kindly Viking" wearing a "Gourd's Gym" tank top (a parody of the then-popular "God's Gym" shirts which were a parody of Gold's Gym). He later appeared as King Twistomer of Nineveh in Jonah: A VeggieTales Movie, a champion sumo wrestler in "Sumo of the Opera," and as Big Jim / Little Jimmy in "Tomato Sawyer and Huckleberry Larry's Big River Rescue."

Ermie Asparagus
 Voiced by Megan Murphy Chambers

Ermie Asparagus (introduced 2012) is an energetic asparagus girl with her spear styled into pigtails. She debuted as Benny LaBoe's (Junior Asparagus's) little sister in the opening story, "Lenny and the Lost Birthday" on "Robin Good and His Not-So-Merry Men." She is also seen as Ermengarde in "The Penniless Princess" and as Little Bo Peep in "The Good Egg of Gooseville" story of "The Little House That Stood." Despite being credited as Libby in "The Penniless Princess," her name was confirmed to be Ermie in the audio commentary for said episode.

Miss Minchin
 Voiced by Marin Miller (2012–2014), Stephanie Southerland (2020)

Miss Minchin (introduced in 2012) is a middle-aged green onion who first appeared in The Penniless Princess as the strict headmistress of "The Minchin School for Lovely Little Ladies". This appearance established a stuffy and high-brow personality. Minchin would later go on to appear as a judge in "The Good Egg of Gooseville" from "The Little House That Stood" and play famed travel critic Madame Chalot in "Beauty and the Beet." She also made a few small cameos in The VeggieTales Show.

Adele Pepper 
 Voiced by Melissa Mabie

Adele Pepper (introduced 2020) is an orange pepper and the "bad news" reporter for Bumblyburg's Channel1 News and later the Bumblyburg Inquisitor in The VeggieTales Show. She is known for reporting things in a negative light and sensationalizing her stories. She is seen on multiple billboards around town, and makes two physical appearances in the episodes "LarryBoy and the Cape-Coat Caper" and "LarryBoy and the Menacing Mushroom".

Her character design is based on Mirabelle from the episode "Beauty and the Beet" from the original VeggieTales series.

Awful Alvin 
 Voiced by Sean Chiplock

Awful Alvin (introduced 2021) is a mutated onion supervillain and is LarryBoy's maniacal arch-nemesis in The VeggieTales Show. Aided by his inanimate sidekick, Lampy, Alvin tries to thwart LarryBoy and take over Bumblyburg in the episodes "LarryBoy and the Angry Eyebrows Trouble" and "LarryBoy and Awful Alvin's Grudge". 

Alvin was originally created by animator Tom Bancroft for the 2D LarryBoy: The Cartoon Adventures. This is the first time the character was brought over into 3D series.

Other

Sheep 
The Sheep (introduced 1996) are nameless, non-anthropomorphic sheep that appear in various episodes and series throughout the VeggieTales franchise. The mostly are used when the Veggie retell Bible stories, such as the episodes "Dave and the Giant Pickle," "Josh and the Big Wall!," "The Ballad of Little Joe," "Abe and the Amazing Promise," "The Little Drummer Boy (2011)," and the Jonah feature film. Outside of the video series, they also appeared on the album A Very Veggie Christmas singing "While By My Sheep" with Junior Asparagus.

Penguins 
The Penguins (introduced 1996) are an anthropomorphic group of silent penguins who appear in minor roles throughout the original VeggieTales series. They first appeared in "The Toy That Saved Christmas" as the workers in Mr. Nezzer's toy factory.

The few named penguins include:
 Harry – Featured in the Silly Songs "The Yodeling Veterinarian of The Alps" and "The Pirates Who Don't Do Anything" dressed as a parrot in the latter. Harry also appeared in a few VeggieTales picture books in the 1990s.
 Eenie, Meenie and Michael – Dr. Flurry's minions in "The League of Incredible Vegetables."

Snoodles 
The Snoodles (introduced 2004) are a fictional species who resides in the town of Snoodleburg from the episode "A Snoodle's Tale." They are based of the fantastical and imaginative creatures found in Dr. Suess books, reflected by the rhyming scheme used to tell the story. They are similar in shape to the Veggie characters, but have disembodied glove hands, an antenna-like appendage atop their heads, and wings. Snoodles enjoy such activities as "eating pancakes with noodles and cutting their hair in shapes like French poodles." Snoodles are not born, but rather "created" by sliding down the chute of the town's clock tower every fourth Tuesday of the month at a quarter past nine o'clock.

There are only a few Snoodles who are ever addressed by name:
 Snoodle Doo (voiced by Philip Spooner) – A young Snoodle who learns about self-esteem.
 Snoodle Lou (voiced by Marc Vulcano) – One of the older Snoodles who bullies Snoodle Doo.
 Snoodlerella (voiced by Rebecca Walker) – A nerdy Snoodle from the town of Snoostein who learns about inner beauty.

Cheese Curls 
The Cheese Curls (introduced 2008) are a group of sentient and gremlin-like cheese puffs from The Pirates Who Don't Do Anything film. They are very aggressive and chase Sedgewick (Mr. Lunt) throughout the movie.

Rock Monster Family 
 Father: Voiced by Mike Nawrocki
 Daughter: Voiced by Ally Nawrocki
 Son: Drake Lyle

The Rock Monsters (introduced 2008) are a family of living rock people who inhabit the "Isle of Walking Rocks" in The Pirates Who Don't Do Anything film. They are made up of anthropomorphic clumps of large boulders and tower over the Veggie characters. The family consists of a father, a daughter, a son, and a baby. They are initially perceived as a threat, but after being entertained by The Pirates Who Don't Do Anything, they quickly become allies that help The Pirates on their adventure. They are also the focus of the film's song "Rock Monster", a parody of The B-52's "Rock Lobster."

Ducks 
 Voiced by Lee Eric Fresko, Adam Frick, Kurt Heinecke, and Mike Nawrocki

The Ducks (introduced 2010) are a team of three baby duckings who first appeared in "Pistachio – The Little Boy That Woodn't" under the care of Gelato (Larry the Cucumber). They later appear as Madame Blueberry's assistant stylists in "Snoodlerella."

Turnips 
 Voiced by Terry Crews, Henry Haggard, Mike Nawrocki and Brian K. Roberts

The Turnips (introduced 2013) are a group of turnips who first appeared as minor characters in "MacLarry and the Stinky Cheese Battle." They look like The French Peas, having similar eyes and faces, albeit bigger in size. They continue to appear in the last few episodes of the original series, with their largest supporting role being the henchmen to Bruce Onion in "Celery Night Fever." Some of the named turnips include Tad, Ted, Tod, Tim, Tom and Terry.

Dust Bunnies 
 Voiced by Mike Nawrocki

The Dust Bunnies (introduced 2015) are a species of sentient dust bunnies who live in the vents of the house in VeggieTales in the House and VeggieTales in the City. The first appear in the episode "When the Dust Bunnies Came to Town" where they are freed from the vents and cause havoc to the Veggie's town. However, some dust bunnies are domesticated and treated as pets amongst the Veggie citizens. Some of the named dust bunnies include Danny, Jimmy and Jerry's pet, and Andy, Emily, Lacey and Riker, a few of Archibald's one hundred pet dust bunnies.

Radish Minions 
 Voiced by Tress MacNeille, Mike Nawrocki, Rob Paulsen and Phil Vischer

The Radish Minions (introduced 2015) are a group of lackeys who serve Motato in his evil deeds. Collectively, they are not very bright. They usually mess up and are chastised by Motato quite frequently. The only ones every addressed by name are Chad, Marty and Randee. They have only appeared in VeggieTales in the House and VeggieTales in the City.

Additional

Notes

VeggieTales
VeggieTales